Andrew Deeley is a former association football player who represented New Zealand at international level. He is the son of former Wolverhampton Wanderers winger and England international, Norman Deeley.

Deeley scored on his full All Whites debut in a 1–1 draw with Australia on 25 October 1986. He played a total of four A-internationals scoring in each of them, including a hat-trick in his final appearance as New Zealand beat Western Samoa 12–0 on 13 November 1987.

References

Year of birth missing (living people)
Living people
New Zealand association footballers
New Zealand international footballers
New Zealand people of English descent
Association football forwards